Towanda Township may refer to the following townships in the United States:

 Towanda Township, McLean County, Illinois
 Towanda Township, Butler County, Kansas
 Towanda Township, Bradford County, Pennsylvania

See also 
 North Towanda Township, Bradford County, Pennsylvania